Melametopia is a genus of flies in the family Chamaemyiidae.

Species
M. nigroaenea (Frey, 1958)

References

Chamaemyiidae
Lauxanioidea genera